Nor Yungas is a province in the Yungas area of the Bolivian department of La Paz. During the presidency of José Manuel Pando the Yungas Province was divided into two parts, the Nor Yungas and the Sud Yungas Province, by law of January 12, 1899. Its administrative seat is the town of Coroico.

Subdivision 
The province is divided into two municipalities.

Places of interest 
 Cotapata National Park and Integrated Management Natural Area

See also 
 Kimsa Warmini
 P'iqi Q'ara
 P'iqi Q'ara (in Coroico)

References 

Provinces of La Paz Department (Bolivia)
Yungas